() is a department of France located in the Grand Paris metropolis in the  region. Its prefecture is Bobigny.

In 2019, it had a population of 1,644,903 across 40 communes.

Geography 
The department is surrounded by the departments of Hauts-de-Seine, Val-de-Marne, Paris, Val-d'Oise, and Seine-et-Marne. It is thus the only one of the five French departments surrounded entirely by other departments of the same region.

 is located to the northeast of Paris. It has a surface area of only 236 km² (91 sq mi), making it one of the smallest departments in France. Since 1 January 2016, together with Paris, they have formed the area of Greater Paris (Grand Paris).

Principal towns

The most populous commune is Saint-Denis; the prefecture Bobigny is the eleventh-most populous. As of 2019, there are 5 communes with more than 70,000 inhabitants:

Administration 
 is made up of three departmental  and 40 communes:

{{column|num=3
|1=
 of:

|2=
 of:

|3=
 of:

}}

History 
 was created in January 1968, through the implementation of a law passed in July 1964.

In October and November, 9,000 cars were burned and 3,000 rioters were arrested.

In 2018, the department had the highest crime rate in metropolitan France. In 2017, the area was the location of 18% of all drug offences in metropolitan France.

Demographics 
 is the French department with the highest proportion of immigrants: 21.7% at the 1999 census (see table below). This figure does not include the children of immigrants born on French soil as well as some native elites from former French colonies and people who came from overseas France. The ratio of ethnic minorities is difficult to estimate accurately as French law prohibits the collection of ethnic data for census taking purposes.

In 2018, the poverty rate was twice the national average at 28%, the unemployment rate was 3 per cent above the national average and 4 percentage points above the Île-de-France average at 12.7%. In 2018, it was estimated that 8–20% of the population in the department were illegal immigrants.

Population development since 1881:

Education 
An education study confirmed falling levels of literacy in the area, where the percentage of pupils who had 25 errors or more increased from 5.4% in 1987 to 19.8% in 2015.

Place of birth of residents

Politics

The president of the Departmental Council is Stéphane Troussel, first elected in 2012.

Presidential elections 2nd round

Current National Assembly Representatives

Tourism

References

Further reading

External links 

 Seine-Saint-Denis Departmental Council 
 Prefecture website 
 Seine-Saint-Denis Tourist Board

 

 
1968 establishments in France
Departments of Île-de-France
Venues of the 2024 Summer Olympics
Olympic swimming venues
Olympic diving venues
States and territories established in 1968